Beer arrived in Australia at the beginning of British colonisation. In 2004 Australia was ranked fourth internationally in per capita beer consumption, at around 110 litres per year; although, the nation ranked considerably lower in a World Health Organization report of alcohol consumption per capita of 12.2 litres. Lager is by far the most popular type of beer consumed in Australia.

The oldest brewery still in operation is the Cascade Brewery, established in Tasmania in 1824. The largest Australian-owned brewery is the family-owned Coopers Brewery, as the other two major breweries Carlton & United Breweries and Lion Nathan are owned by Japan's Asahi and Kirin Brewing Company respectively.

Non-alcohol beer variations continue to increase their market share in Australia. According to BWS in December 2019, non alcoholic beer sales had risen 60% since July that year.

Market characteristics
Within an alcoholic beverage market worth some $16.3 billion, beer comprises about 48% compared to wine at 29% and spirits at 21%. Within the beer sector, premium beers have a 7.8% share of the market; full-strength beer has 70.6%; mid-strength holds 12%; and light beer has 9.6%. 85% of beer is produced by national brewers, the remainder by regional or microbreweries. Microbreweries manufacturing less than 30,000 litres receive a 60% excise rebate.

History

18th century
The history of Australian beer starts very early in Australia's colonial history. Captain James Cook brought beer with him on his ship Endeavour as a means of preserving drinking water. On 1 August 1768, as Cook was fitting out the Endeavour for its voyage, Nathaniel Hulme wrote to Joseph Banks with a recommendation:

Beer was still being consumed on-board two years later in 1770, when Cook was the first European to discover the east coast of Australia.

The drink of choice for the first settlers and convicts was rum, as represented in a supposed traditional convict song:

Cut yer name across me backbone
Stretch me skin across yer drum
Iron me up on Pinchgut Island
From now to Kingdom Come.
I'll eat yer Norfolk Dumpling
Like a juicy Spanish plum,
Even dance the Newgate Hornpipe
If ye'll only gimme Rum!

The first official brewer in Australia was John Boston who brewed a beverage from Indian corn bittered with cape gooseberry leaves. It is likely though that beer was brewed unofficially much earlier. The first pub, the Mason Arms was opened in 1796 in Parramatta by James Larra, a freed convict.

19th century

Rum was so popular—and official currency was in such short supply—that it became a semi-official currency for a period of time (see Rum corps), and even played a role in a short-lived military coup, the Rum rebellion in 1808. Drunkenness was a significant problem in the early colony:

As a means of reducing drunkenness, beer was promoted as a safer and healthier alternative to rum:

Although modern Australian beer is predominantly lager, early Australian beers were exclusively top-fermented and quick-maturing ales. Lager was not brewed in Australia until 1885. Early beers were also brewed without the benefit of hops, as no-one had successfully cultivated hops in Australia and importation was difficult. James Squire was the first to successfully cultivate hops in 1804, and he also opened a pub and brewed beer. The Government Gazette from 1806 mentions that he was awarded a cow herd from the government for his efforts.

In September 1804, a government-owned brewery opened in Parramatta, followed by a rival privately owned brewery three months later. The government brewery was sold two years later to Thomas Rushton, who was its head (and only) brewer. Brewing rapidly expanded in all of the Australian colonies and by 1871 there were 126 breweries in Victoria alone, which at the time had a population of only 800,000.

Notable events from this period include:
1832 – Peter Degraves starts the Cascade Brewery in Hobart. It is Australia's oldest operational brewery.
1835 – Tooth brewery established in Sydney.
1837 – James Stokes establishes the Albion Brewery, Perth's first brewery, which later became the Emu Brewery.
1838 – John Warren starts "The Torrens", Adelaide's first brewery. 
1838 – John Mills establishes the first brewery in Melbourne.
1844 – William Henry Clark founded the Halifax Street Brewery in SA (Later to be known as West End Brewery)
1848 – James Stokes opens the Stanley brewery at the Foot of Mt Eliza. (Later Changed to the Emu Brewery)
1853 – Queensland's first brewery, "The Brisbane Brewery" is opened by John Beach.
1862 – Thomas Cooper establishes the Coopers Brewery in the Adelaide suburb of Norwood. The brewery continues to be owned and operated by the Cooper family, and since 2011 has been the largest Australian-owned brewery.
1864 – Carlton brewery opens in Melbourne.
1881 – CS Button opens the Esk Brewery in Launceston 
1882 – Cohn Brothers' Victoria Brewery in Bendigo becomes the first brewery in Australia to brew lager.
1883 – In 1883, James I and his son took over the Esk Brewery. J. Boag & Son was officially formed
1887 – The Foster brothers arrive from New York with refrigeration equipment and establish the first lager brewery to use refrigeration in Australia.
1889 – Lager is first brewed in Queensland at the Castlemaine and Quinlan brewery.
Tasmania was the first Australian colony to tax beer.  Its Beer Duty Act of 1880 established a duty of 3 pence per gallon which was raised to four pence in 1892.

20th century
By 1900 the number of breweries had begun to dwindle as a result of the recession of the 1890s. In 1901, just after Federation, the new federal government passed the Beer and Excise Act. This act regulated the making and selling of beer and made homebrewing illegal. The provisions in this act, regarded by many as draconian, led to the closure of many breweries. In Sydney 16 out of 21 breweries closed either immediately after the act's introduction or soon afterwards. The remaining breweries began a process of consolidation, with larger breweries buying out the smaller ones. Within a short period of time, only two breweries remained in Sydney: Tooths and Tooheys. In Melbourne, five breweries merged in 1907 to form the giant Carlton and United Breweries.

1951 - Harry Ellis-Kells founded the Darwin Brewery (to be known as N.T Brewery)

21st century
Since 2011, Kirin-owned Lion Co and AB InBev-owned Foster's Group own every major brewery in Australia, with the exception of Coopers.
Boag's Brewery, previously owned by San Miguel, was sold to Lion Nathan for A$325 million in November 2007. In 2006 Boag's Brewery reported total revenues of A$92 million.

Although Foster's Lager is not a popular domestic beer in the 21st century, its popularity internationally has grown and the product is made mostly for export. In January 2005, the brand was one of the ten best-selling beers globally.

The introduction of the Tap King product by Lion Nathan in mid-2013 caused controversy due to the perceived impact upon alcohol venues. The product is a home draught beer dispenser and raised concerns regarding lower patronage rates for venues due to a greater incentive for consumers to drink beer in home environments. The product is sold with a  gas chamber that is cooled for eight hours prior to use.

Beers by region
Before federation in 1901, Australia was a patchwork of separate colonies, each with different laws regulating the production and sale of alcohol. In addition, until the late 1880s when the rail network began to link the capital cities together, the only means of transporting foods in bulk between the colonies was by sea. This prevented even the largest breweries from distributing significant amounts outside their home city. This allowed strong regional brands to emerge; and, although all but one of the major regional brands (Coopers) are now owned by multinational companies, loyalty to the local brewery remains strong today.
New South Wales: Tooheys, Reschs and Tooths
Northern Territory: NT Draught
Queensland: Castlemaine XXXX, Powers and Great Northern
South Australia: Coopers, West End and Southwark
Tasmania: Boags in the north, Cascade in the south
Victoria: Carlton Draught, Melbourne Bitter, Victoria Bitter 
Western Australia: Swan, Emu and Kalgoorlie

While Foster's Group owns many of these brands, Foster's Lager itself is not considered a local drink anywhere in Australia.

Speciality beers 

Speciality brews in Australia are produced by both major brewers and microbreweries, and include a wide variety of ales. Microbreweries exist throughout the country, including small towns, but the availability of such beers on-tap in venues is often limited.

Microbrewery Nail Brewing, from Perth, Western Australia, produced a beer in 2010 using water from an Antarctic iceberg, and sold it at auction for US$1,850. The batch of 30 bottles was created to raise money for the Sea Shepherd Conservation Society, which assisted with the procuring of the ice.

Australian styles 
Australia has some unique beer styles of its own:

Brewed under licence

Imported premium beers have started to gain market share in Australia. The two Australian corporate brewers responded to this by signing licence agreements with foreign brands to brew their beers here. Foster's Group brews Kronenbourg. Coopers Brewery brews Carlsberg in Australia. Lion Nathan locally produces Guinness, Heineken, Beck's, Stella Artois and Kirin. Brewers claim that their locally produced product tastes better because it is fresher, and local operations are overseen by the parent brewers using strict guidelines. However, groups such as the Australian Consumers Association say that such beers should have clearer, more prominent labels to inform drinkers.

Sizes

Beer glasses 

Prior to metrication in Australia, one could buy beer or cider in glasses of 4, 5, 6, 7, 9, 10, 15 or 20 (imperial) fluid ounces. Each sized glass had a different name in each Australian state.

These were replaced by glasses of size 115, 140, 170, 200, 285, 425 and 570 mL, and as Australians travel more, the differences are decreasing.

Smaller sizes have been phased out over time, and in the 21st century, very few pubs serve glasses smaller than 200 mL (approximately 7 imp fl oz).

Those typically available are the 200 mL, 285 mL (10 fl oz) and 425 mL (15 fl oz), with increasingly many pubs also having pints (570 mL, approximately 20 imp fl oz) available. It is also common for pubs and hotels to serve large jugs filled to 1140ml ( approximately two imp pints).

With the introduction of the National Trade Measurement Regulations in 2009 there are no prescribed sizes for beverage measures for the sale of beer, ale and stout, so terms such as seven, middy, pot or schooner do not legally specify a particular size. A typical "schooner" glass can be calibrated to hold 425ml to the rim but poured with 15mm of head, resulting in a "schooner" of 375ml of beer and 50ml of froth.

South Australia in particular has some unusually named measures:
 6 fl oz (170 mL) – prior to metrification this glass was known as a "Butcher"
 7 fl oz (200 mL), became known as a "Butcher" in later years after smaller sizes were phased out
 10 fl oz (285 mL) known as a "schooner". Prior to metrication and standardisation of glass sizes throughout Australia, schooners in SA were 9 fluid ounces (256 mL).
 15 fl oz (425 mL) known as a "pint"
 20 fl oz (570 mL) known as an "imperial pint"

Many of these sizes are now rarely used. In contemporary SA pubs and restaurants, the most frequent measures are the "schooner" of 285 mL (an imperial half pint), and the "pint" of 425 mL. "Imperial pints" are also increasingly popular, along with the sale of "premium" and non-locally brewed beer in bottles of between 300 mL to 375 mL.

Note that the SA "schooner" and "pint" are considerably smaller than the measures of the same name used elsewhere: 
the SA "schooner" (285 mL) is the same size as other States' pot / middy / half pint 
the SA "pint" (425 mL) is the same size as other States' schooner, and is three-quarters of an imperial pint.

Headmasters is one of the most common glass manufacturers, at least for the schooner size. Many pubs, in Sydney and Melbourne particularly, offer Guinness style and/or conical pint glasses along with tankard glass and British dimpled glass pint mugs.

Larger serving measurements have become increasingly popular, such as Jugs, 1 fluid litre Maß (pronounced like "mass", normally in German-themed bars) and beer towers (although technically illegal due to strict self-service of alcohol laws, these are in some Asian bars/karaoke parlours) have grown in popularity around Australia in tourist spots.

Beer bottles

Prior to metrication, beer bottles were frequently , while a carton of beer contained a dozen bottles (two gallons) of beer. 

In 1958, cans were introduced by CUB, which were originally in steel and the same size as the bottle; other breweries introduced these in the 1960s.

A carton of nine litres of beer in stubbies (i.e. 24 bottles) or cans became known as a "slab" because compared to the more cube-like shape of the traditional cartons, they were flatter, and hence, like slabs.

Traditional bottles subsequently became known as "long necks" or "tallies" to distinguish them from stubbies, and in Western Australia, the 750ml "long neck" bottle is known as a "king brown" because of the size and typical brown coloured glass. 
 
In the 21st century, most bottled beer in Australia is sold in 250 mL (Throwdown/Twist Top), 375 mL (Stubby) or 750 mL (Long Neck) sizes. Carlton United briefly increased to 800 mL in the 1990s and 2000s, but this has since been reduced to the original 750 mL.

Bottle sizes of 330 mL, 345 mL and 355 mL (imported from the United States, equal to 12 US fl oz) are becoming increasingly common, particularly among microbreweries, so-called "premium" beers, and imported beers.

In the Northern Territory, the once-common "Darwin Stubby", a large two litre bottle, is now sold largely as a tourist gimmick, albeit very successfully.

Most bottles are lightweight "single use only", though some are still reusable, and in some cases (e.g. Coopers 750 mL), breweries are reintroducing refillable bottles, such as the Growler (a large bottle of approximately two litres intended for re-use) sold by Four Pines Brewery – a boon to home brewers. In South Australia, container deposits on beer bottles and cans (and some other types of beverage containers) support a well established network of recycling centres, providing significant environmental benefits as well as generating employment opportunities for unskilled workers.

See also

 Australian pub
 Beer and breweries by region
 List of breweries in Australia

References

Notes

Further reading

External links 

 Your guide to Australian beers, AustralianBeers.com
 Beer Guide (Australia), Beer Guide
 Vegetarian Beers in Australia, Vegetarian Network

 
Australian cuisine